Clothing label may refer to:

A clothing brand
A physical textile labeling on garments
A wash care label on garments